Louise Dupré (born July 9, 1949) is a Quebec poet and novelist.

The daughter of Cécile Paré and Arthur Dupré, she was born in Sherbrooke and was educated at the Université de Sherbrooke and the Université de Montréal, receiving a PhD in literature from the latter institution. From 1981 to 1984, she was a member of the publishing collective Éditions du Remue-Ménage. In 1988, she became a member of the editorial committee for the magazine Voix et Images : Littérature québécoise;  she served as director from 1995 to 1998. She taught at the Université du Québec à Montréal.

Her poetry collection La Peau familière (1983) received the Prix Alfred-DesRochers. In 1999, she was admitted to the Académie des lettres du Québec and, in 2002, to the Royal Society of Canada.

Selected works 
 Noir déjà, poetry (1993), received the Grand Prix de poésie from the Festival international de Trois-Rivières
 La memoria, novel (1997), received the Prix Ringuet from the Académie des lettres du Québec and the prize awarded by the Société des écrivains Canadiens
 Tout comme elle, play (2006), received the Critics' prize for 2005–2006 in the category Montreal from the Association québécoise des critiques de théâtre
 Plus haut que les flammes (2011), received the Governor General's Award for French-language poetry and the Grand Prix Québécor from the Festival international de la poésie
 La Main hantée (2017) won the Governor General's Award for French-language poetry

Further reading
 Andrea Krotthammer: "La vie d'une femme, c'est la marche sur un fil." «L'ecriture funambule» de Louise Dupré à l'exemple des relations mère-fille". Masterarbeit, Universität Innsbruck. Honored by the "Prix d'Exellence du Gouvernement du Québec" 2016/2017.

References 

1949 births
Living people
Canadian poets in French
Canadian novelists in French
Canadian dramatists and playwrights in French
Journalists from Quebec
Governor General's Award-winning poets
Fellows of the Royal Society of Canada
Canadian women journalists
Canadian women novelists
Canadian women dramatists and playwrights
Canadian women poets
20th-century Canadian poets
20th-century Canadian novelists
20th-century Canadian dramatists and playwrights
20th-century Canadian women writers
21st-century Canadian novelists
21st-century Canadian poets
21st-century Canadian dramatists and playwrights
21st-century Canadian women writers
Writers from Sherbrooke
Université de Sherbrooke alumni
Université de Montréal alumni
Academic staff of the Université du Québec à Montréal
Canadian women non-fiction writers